"Tears in the Club" (stylized in all lowercase on the album version only) is a song by English singer-songwriter FKA Twigs, featuring vocals from Canadian singer the Weeknd. It was released on 16 December 2021, as the lead single from Twigs' first mixtape, Caprisongs (2022). The two artists wrote the song with producers Cirkut, Arca, and el Guincho, alongside Ali Tamposi.

Background and composition
"Tears in the Club" leans towards a more contemporary pop sound that strays away from the type of FKA Twigs' regular music, but "maintains the etherealness and distortion for which she's become known". The song has been described as an R&B-pop track, that pairs "a booming dance floor beat and atmospheric synths" with Twigs and the Weeknd belting out lyrics "that are packed with heartache and angst". It interpolates the section of "@@@@@" known as "Phantasy", composed and performed by Arca. Twigs announced the release date of the single alongside a trailer video on 13 December 2021.

Music video
A music video for the song premiered on 16 December 2021. It was directed by Amber Grace Johnson. The video pays homage to Canadian rapper Drake's Sprite commercial in the beginning. It starts with FKA Twigs dancing in a nightclub with bright lights. Twigs walks down the street crying and is subsequently picked up by a group of dancers. She is then joined by the Weeknd and performs for him in a fish tank, who watches her in tears.

Charts

References

2021 singles
2021 songs
FKA Twigs songs
The Weeknd songs
Song recordings produced by el Guincho
Songs written by the Weeknd
Songs written by Cirkut (record producer)
Songs written by el Guincho
Songs written by Arca (musician)
Songs written by Ali Tamposi
Song recordings produced by Cirkut (record producer)
Young Turks (record label) singles